Adam Frye (born February 15, 1974) is an American soccer player who last played for Southern California Seahorses in the USL Premier Development League.

Career

Youth and College
Frye was a Parade Magazine High School All American soccer player the 1992 New Mexico High School Soccer Player of the Year. He played college soccer at the University of California, Los Angeles from 1992 to 1995. A forward in high school, UCLA coach Sigi Schmid moved Frye to the backline his first season at UCLA. In 1995, in his senior season, Frye was named his team's defensive MVP.

Professional
Frye was selected in the first round (fourth overall) of the 1996 MLS College Draft by Tampa Bay Mutiny. He spent three seasons in Tampa Bay before being released in 1998. On February 7, 1999, the San Jose Clash chose Frye in the first round (third overall) of the 1999 MLS Supplemental Draft. He played only three games with the Clash, who waived him at the end of the season. He began the 2000 pre-season with the San Diego Flash of the USL A-League. However, on March 16, 2000, the Los Angeles Galaxy picked him in the Waiver Draft. He only played six games with the Galaxy that season as they loaned him to MLS Project 40 for one game, then back to the Flash.  He also played one game with the Orange County Zodiac in 2000.

In 2001, he saw time in twenty-two games, many as a forward, as the Galaxy was hit with several injuries to its front line. Frye and his teammates also won the 2001 U.S. Open Cup. He played another twenty-games in 2002, but was released at the end of the season and retired from playing professionally.

In 2005, he played in a Chivas USA reserve game.

In 2009 Frye came out of retirement to play a season with the Southern California Seahorses in the USL Premier Development League.

Personal
Frye met his wife, Gina, through a charity auction benefiting children suffering from cancer. Gina paid $350 to go on a date with him, not expecting the date to materialize, but considering the money well spent if it helped the children. She eventually went on the date with Frye, eventually leading to their marriage.

References

1974 births
Living people
American soccer players
Major League Soccer players
LA Galaxy players
Orange County Blue Star players
Sacramento Geckos players
San Diego Flash players
San Jose Earthquakes players
Southern California Seahorses players
Tampa Bay Cyclones players
Tampa Bay Mutiny players
UCLA Bruins men's soccer players
USL League Two players
People from Alamogordo, New Mexico
MLS Pro-40 players
A-League (1995–2004) players
Soccer players from New Mexico
USISL Select League players
Tampa Bay Mutiny draft picks
San Jose Earthquakes draft picks
Association football defenders
Association football forwards